The snubnose pompano (Trachinotus blochii), also called the snubnose dart, golden pompano, and golden pomfret, is an Asia Pacific species of pompano in the family Carangidae. It is a pelagic fish associated with rocky reefs, coral reefs as well as inshore habitats. 

It is found in warm waters ranging from the Indian Ocean, the Red Sea, and eastern Africa to the Central Pacific Ocean; north to Japan and as far south as the coast of southern New South Wales. It is an angling and minor commercial fish species. The maximum length is 65 cm and maximum weight is 3.4 kilograms. The specific epithet blochii is named for Marcus Elieser Bloch. Other common names include buck-nosed trevally, oyster cracker, oyster-eater, and snub-nosed swallowtail. There are reports of ciguatera poisoning when consumed.

References

Trachinotus
Fish of the Pacific Ocean
Taxa named by Bernard Germain de Lacépède
snubnose dart